Massimiliano Frani (born 10 January 1967 in Venice, Italy) is an Italian pianist, composer and music pedagogue. He is the founder of the project MET – Music Education Therapy and director of the Armoniæ Centro Internazionale di Musica e Cultura. He currently works as a musical art teacher at Elevations RTC, a residential treatment center in Syracuse, Utah, and lives in the state.

Education 
Frani began his piano education at the Conservatorio di Musica Benedetto Marcello di Venezia in Venice, where he graduated with honors. After his studies in literature and theatre at the Ca' Foscari University of Venice, Frani attended Brigham Young University in Provo, Utah. He earned a Master’s and Ph.D. degree in music, piano performance, and pedagogy. Among others, he studied with Vincenzo Pertile, Paul Pollei, and Jan Ekier.

Performance career 
Frani has performed with chamber music ensembles, and with orchestras in Italy, the US, Japan, Germany, Canada, and Hungary. His performances are described by critics as “spiritually resonant”  and “high-class listening experience[s]”. In addition, Frani conducted orchestras in several countries and worked with several musicians including Martin Jones, Hiroko Nakamura, Alexander Peskanov and Livia Rev. In collaboration with Paul Pollei, Jeffrey Shumway, and Mack Wilberg, Frani performed for many years as part of the American Piano Quartet.

Frani has competed in the Gina Bachauer International Piano Competitionn and the Esther Honen’s International Piano Competition and has been a winner of multiple national piano competitions, including the Concorso Nazionale Pianistico Premio Venezia and the Concorso Nazionale Pianistico di Albenga. Since 1994 he has been a frequent judge in international piano competitions, such as the Gina Bachauer International Piano Competition, the National Music Teachers Association Competition in Montreal and the Piano Teachers National Association Competition in Tokyo.

Performing Arts Administrator Career 
After graduation, Frani has served in various performing arts administration capacities.  Main experiences include Associate Director of the Gina Bachauer International Piano Foundation, in Salt Lake City (Utah, USA); Artistic Consultant for the International Piano Academy Lake Como dedicated to Martha Argerich, and Superintendent of the Orchestra del Teatro Olimpico (Vicenza, Italy).  Under Frani’s leadership each cultural organization has developed programming, outreach, and funding.  During each respective assignment, each organizations achieved positive accomplishments: the Bachauer Foundation became the first piano foundation to host a 4-year cycle of international competitions; the International Piano Academy Lake Como opened its doors to the acclaimed Summer School; The Orchestra del Teatro Olimpico funded seasons which included Il Suono dell’Olimpico (including world premiere by composer Cynthia Lee Wong), productions from the Centre Chorégraphique National de Créteil et du Val-de-Marne Compagnie Käfig (Boxe Boxe & Kafig Brazil), BdT Junior Company (Coppelia), Malandin Ballet Biarritz (Romeo et Juliette), Compagnie La Baraka and Ballet National Algerien (NYA), Mimulus Cia De Dança (Dolores), Momix Dance Company (Alchemy), Ballet National de Marseille (Orfeo e Euridice). The theater also held the first co-joined opera production with the Settimane Musicali dell’Olimpico and the Società del Quartetto, with numerous concerts presented by music’s pinnacle performers.

Frani currently teaches musical arts at Elevations RTC, a residential treatment center in Syracuse, Utah, for teens ages 13–18.

Music Pedagogy 
Frani has given seminars and masterclasses and presented lectures at universities, music academies, and conferences throughout the world. Examples include the Park City International Chamber Music Festival (USA), the Frankfurt University of Music and Performing Arts, the International Piano Academy Lake Como (Italy), and the ASPEN Education Group (USA). He worked with internationally known pedagogues like Joseph Banowetz, Edna Golandsky, Lee Kum-Sing and Arie Vardi. 

Frani is the initiator and director of the international project MET-Music Education Therapy™. Combining music pedagogy, cognitive psychology and neuropsychiatry, MET follows an interdisciplinary approach to music for premature infants.

Compositions 
Brigham Young University, Provo - USA: Wind’s Waltz, Album Pianistico. ASCAP, 1736647 © USA - 2010;
Bright Line Films, Hollywood - USA: Indian Travesty, documentary. Film score. ASCAP, 1736647 © USA - 2009;
Bright Line Films, Hollywood - USA: Frank, Film. Film score. ASCAP, 1736647 © USA - 2009;
Fondazione Amici dell’Arena, Verona - Italia: Chant, opera in tre atti. ASCAP, 1736647 © USA - 2008.

References

External links 
 https://web.archive.org/web/20130517134116/http://musicedtherapy.org/
N. Pas: Frani, un compositore veneziano a Hollywood. In: Leggo. 05.05.2012. p. 21.
Francesco Verni: First Hollywood then Broadway: In: Corriere della Sera. 16.02.2007. p. 13. 
Paolo Accattatis: Frani's Bravura. In: Il Gazzettino. 20.07.2002. p. 22.

1967 births
Living people
Musicians from Venice
Italian male pianists
21st-century pianists
21st-century Italian male musicians